Deh-e Bozorg (also Romanized as Deh Bozorg) is a village in Padena-ye Olya Rural District, Padena District, Semirom County, Isfahan Province, Iran. At the 2006 census, its population was 219, in 44 families.

References 

Populated places in Semirom County